Primal Scream are a Scottish rock band formed in 1982.

Primal Scream may also refer to:

 Primal Scream (Harvard), a student tradition
 The Primal Scream (1970), a psychology book by Dr. Arthur Janov about primal therapy
 Primal Scream (Maynard Ferguson album) (1976)
 Primal Scream (Primal Scream album) (1989)
 "Primal Scream" (song) (1991), by Mötley Crüe
 "Primal Scream", an episode of the television series Birds of Prey (2002)

See also
 Primal therapy